Ahangar Kola-ye Sofla (also Romanized as Āhangar Kolā-ye Soflá) is a village in Dabuy-ye Jonubi Rural District, Dabudasht District, Amol County, Mazandaran Province, Iran. At the 2006 census, its population was 574, in 155 families.

References 

Populated places in Amol County